The attack on USS New Ironsides in October 1863 was one of the first successful torpedo boat engagements in history. Confederate forces in Charleston, South Carolina deployed the newly built semi-submersible CSS David to attach a spar torpedo to the hull of USS New Ironsides. Though the attack is regarded as a rebel victory, the Union ship was saved from serious damage.

Attack
Because it was a great impediment to Confederate commerce and warfare, there was no choice but to try to lift the Union blockade in any way possible. CSS David was one of the South's secret weapons. Similar to the submarine H.L. Hunley, the boat was designed to destroy enemy ships by stealthily sneaking up to their sides and placing an explosive on their hulls. The David was only fifty feet long with a beam of six feet and a draft of five feet. Her crew consisted of just four officers and men. She was under the command of Lieutenant William T. Glassell during her three year career. On the night of 5 October, at about 8:00 am the torpedo boat headed out from the pier toward the fourteen gun ironclad USS New Ironsides, which was considered the most formidable warship in the navy. She had also survived a failed torpedo boat attack in August 1863. An hour later the rebels were approaching the ironclad when lookouts spotted them fifty yards away, just before they attached the torpedo. The Union commander Captain Stephen C. Rowan reported the following: "At 9 p.m. discovered a very peculiar looking steamer which at first appeared like a boat standing toward our starboard beam from seaward; hailed her rapidly four times, and she making no reply, fired into her with musketry; she returned fire, dangerously wounding Ensign C.W. Howard in charge of the deck the steamer struck us near No. 6 port, starboard side, exploding a large torpedo, shaking the vessel and throwing up an immense column of water, part of which fell on our decks."

When the water fell back, some of it went down the Davids smokestack and put out the fire in her engine. The explosion ripped a large fissure in the ironclad's starboard quarter and her crew had to quickly repair the hole but the ship remained leaky. Damage was also inflicted to the ship's armory bulkhead and some storerooms, but casualties were light. There were two wounded, one of whom later died, and a third man who suffered from "confusions". CSS David was heavily damaged, enough for her commander to order his men to abandon ship. Ensign C. W. Cannon could not swim so he remained aboard and after the others left they tried to swim for nearby Morris Island under fire. It was at this time Assistant Engineer J. H. Tomb decided to go back to the torpedo boat where he restarted the fire and sailed away. The remaining two Confederates, including Lieutenant Glassel, surrendered to the men of New Ironsides after evacuating the David. New Ironsides was apparently not in threat of sinking and the damage proved to be mostly superficial. She returned to blockade duty after taking a short time in Philadelphia to make repairs. CSS David was repaired as well and she eventually made attacks on USS Memphis and USS Wabash. Several torpedo boats of the David class were captured at the end of the war. The David may have been among them.

Notes

References

Naval battles of the American Civil War
Confederate victories of the American Civil War
History of South Carolina
Charleston County, South Carolina
Battles of the Lower Seaboard Theater and Gulf Approach of the American Civil War
1863 in South Carolina
Battles of the American Civil War in South Carolina
October 1863 events